James Whitelaw Hamilton (1860–1932) RSA, RSW was a Scottish artist, member of the Glasgow School (the Glasgow Boys), of the Royal Scottish Academy (RSA) and of the New English Art Club.

Career

Hamilton was born in Glasgow, where he studied before moving to Paris, where he became a pupil of Aimé Morot and of Pascal Dagnan-Bouveret.   Returning to Scotland in 1884, he spent time at Cockburnspath with other future Glasgow Boys James Guthrie, Joseph Crawhall and Arthur Melville.  In 1887 he was elected a member of the New English Art club, exhibiting at their annual exhibitions in London.  He also showed regularly with the Glasgow Institute of the Fine Arts, of which he was honorary secretary for many years.  He became an associate of the RSA in 1911, and a full academician in 1922.  He was also a member of the Royal Scottish Society of Painters in Watercolour (RSW).

In 1897 Hamilton won a gold medal at the Munich International Exhibition, which led to several overseas commissions, including one from Victor Emmanuel III of Italy, who appointed him a Cavaliere of the Order of the Crown of Italy in 1901. His sister, Maggie Hamilton was also an artist.

In 1900 the art dealer Alexander Reid organised a one-man-show for Hamilton at his gallery at 124 St Vincent Street in central Glasgow.

At the Venice Biennale 
Hamilton's work was shown in the British Pavilion at the Venice Biennale at all eight biennales between 1897 and 1910.  In 1897, 1899 and 1901 he was part of the Scottish artists' section of the exhibition.

Collections

Hamilton's works can be seen in many Scottish, English and overseas public collections, including the following:
 Glasgow Museums & Art Galleries
 University of Dundee
 National Museums Liverpool
 the Hunterian Museum and Art Gallery
 the Royal Scottish Academy
 the Paisley Institute Museum and Art Gallery
 the Neue Pinakothek, Munich
 the Saint Louis Art Museum
 the Carnegie Institute, Pittsburgh

Family

His sister Maggie Hamilton was also an artist. She married the architect A. N. Paterson.

References

1860 births
1932 deaths
19th-century Scottish painters
Scottish male painters
20th-century Scottish painters
Modern painters
Social realist artists
Royal Scottish Academicians
Glasgow School
People from Helensburgh
Artists from Glasgow
Recipients of the Order of the Crown (Italy)
Sibling artists
19th-century Scottish male artists
20th-century Scottish male artists